The following is a  list of  characters in the animated TV series Postman Pat.

Main
Pat Clifton (series 1–8): postman, the main character and primary protagonist; husband of Sara and father of Julian. He always manages to land himself in difficult and amusing situations and is friends with almost everyone in Greendale and the surrounding countryside. Voiced by Ken Barrie from series 1–5, Lewis MacLeod from series 6–8, Stephen Mangan and Ronan Keating in Postman Pat: The Movie. Bradley Clarkson has also voiced the character in various stage productions.
Jess (series 1–8): Postman Pat's black-and-white cat. He is very clever and always seems to be able to help people when they are in need. Voiced by Melissa Sinden from series 3-8 and Mike Disa in Postman Pat: The Movie.

Supporting characters
 Ajay Bains (series 3–8): a train driver. He is in charge of the Pencaster Flyer as well as his beloved Greendale Rocket steam train. He and his family moved to Pencaster from India. Voiced by Kulvinder Ghir in the TV series and Brian George and TJ Ramini in Postman Pat: The Movie.
Meera Bains (series 3–8): eight-year-old daughter of Ajay and Nisha and also Julian Clifton's pen pal. Voiced by Archie Panjabi. Jo Wyatt voiced her in Postman Pat: The Movie. 
Nikhil Bains (series 3–8): baby boy of Ajay and Nisha.
Nisha Bains (series 3–8): Ajay's wife, who combines running the Station Café with looking after her two children, Meera and Nikhil. Her best friend is Sara Clifton. She is voiced by Archie Panjabi. Parminder Nagra voiced her in Postman Pat: The Movie. 
Chris Beacon (series 8): a lighthouse keeper. Voiced by Joel Trill.
Bonnie (series 4–8): Mrs Goggins' West Highland White Terrier. Voiced by Melissa Sinden.
Julian Clifton (series 2–8): seven-year-old schoolboy and the only child of Postman Pat and Sara. Voiced by Carole Boyd in series 2 and Janet James from series 3 onward. Sandra Teles voiced him in Postman Pat: The Movie.
Sara Clifton (series 2–8): Pat’s wife and Julian's mother. In the early episodes, Sara is a stay-at-home mother, but from series 3 onwards, she has a part-time job in the station café with her new friend Nisha. She is voiced by Carole Boyd in the TV series and Susan Duerden in Postman Pat: The Movie.
Granny Dryden (series 1–2): a friendly old lady who lives in a cottage in the Greendale countryside. She is mildly infirm, hence her asking Pat to help her with assorted household jobs. She is also hard of hearing, begetting the need for Pat to talk loudly to her. She has many old belongings, many of which she has given to Pat and others. Voiced by Ken Barrie.
Peter Fogg (series 1–2): a farmer who works at Greendale Farm with the Pottages and lives with his wife Jenny. He plays the guitar and rides a motorcycle. He is voiced by Ken Barrie.
Major Forbes (series 2): a retired army major who lives at Garner Hall. He is voiced by Ken Barrie in series 2 and Jacob Witkin in Postman Pat: The Movie. 
Sarah Gilbertson (series 1–8): brunette schoolchild, daughter of Dr Sylvia Gilbertson. She can be very bossy and full of herself, sometimes with explosive results, but is good friends with all the local children. Voiced by Ken Barrie in series 1 and Carole Boyd from series 2-8.
Dr Sylvia Gilbertson (series 1–8): Greendale's blonde Welsh doctor and mother of Sarah Gilbertson. PC Selby has a crush on her. Voiced by Ken Barrie in series 1, Carole Boyd from series 2–8 and Anastasia Griffith in Postman Pat: The Movie. 
Ted Glen (series 1–8): the local handyman who can just about fix anything. Ted is something of an inventor and enjoys inventing strange contraptions; he mostly occupies himself with general pottering about in his workshop or fixing his ageing Land Rover. He is Pat's best friend. He was voiced by Ken Barrie from series 1–6, Bradley Clarkson from series 7-8 and Dan Hildebrand in Postman Pat: The Movie. 
Mrs Goggins (series 1–8): the village postmistress in Greendale, Mrs Goggins came to Greendale from Scotland and has a small West Highland Terrier, Bonnie. Voiced by Ken Barrie in series 1, Carole Boyd in series 2-8 and Jane Carr in Postman Pat: The Movie. 
Miss Rebecca Hubbard (series 1–2): Miss Hubbard is a friend of Pat who also lives in a cottage in the countryside. She has her own bike and likes to go to choir practice and organise events. She was voiced by Ken Barrie in series 1, Carole Boyd in series 2 and Jean Gilpin in Postman Pat: The Movie. 
Michael Lam (series 6–8): a Chinese man who runs the mobile phone shop and library. He is voiced by Kulvinder Ghir. Kieron Elliot voiced him in Postman Pat: The Movie. 
George Lancaster (series 1–2): a farmer at Intake Farm. Voiced by Ken Barrie.,Jacob Witkin voiced him in Postman Pat: The Movie.
Julia Pottage (series 1–5): black-haired orchard farmer, mother of Katy and Tom. Voiced by Ken Barrie in series 1 and Carole Boyd thereafter.
Katy Pottage (series 1–5): blonde schoolgirl and twin sister of Tom. Daughter of Julia Pottage. Voiced by Ken Barrie in series 1, Carole Boyd in series 2 and Archie Panjabi from series 3 to 5.
Tom Pottage (series 1–5): a timid blonde boy and twin brother of Katy. He was voiced by Ken Barrie in series 1, Carole Boyd in series 2 and Kulvinder Ghir from series 3 to 5.
Charlie Pringle (series 1–8): seven years old and very clever; loves science. Voiced by Ken Barrie in series 1 and Carole Boyd from series 2 to present. Charlie Woodward voiced him in Postman Pat: The Movie.
Jeff Pringle (series 2–5): school teacher and father of Charlie. Voiced by Ken Barrie.
Constable Arthur Selby(series 2–present): the black-haired policeman with a moustache speaks with a London accent; he patrols in Greendale and Pencaster. The father of Lucy Selby. He is highly incompetent but still takes his business very seriously. Voiced by Ken Barrie from series 2 to 6 and Bradley Clarkson from series 7 onwards. Enn Reitel voiced him in Postman Pat: The Movie.
Lucy Selby (series 1–8): brunette schoolchild and the seven-year-old daughter of PC Selby. Voiced by Ken Barrie in series 1, Carole Boyd in series 2, Janet James from series 2 to present and Teresa Gallagher in Postman Pat: The Movie. 
Ben Taylor (series 6–8): General Manager of the Pencaster Sorting Office who works with Pat for the Special Delivery Service. Voiced by Lewis MacLeod. TJ Ramini voiced him in Postman Pat: The Movie.
Lauren Taylor (series 6–8): wife of Ben and the new schoolteacher in Greendale. Voiced by Janet James. Anastasia Griffith voiced her in Postman Pat: The Movie. 
Lizzy Taylor (series 6–8): nine-year-old schoolchild and daughter of Ben and Lauren. Lizzy has cerebral palsy and uses a wheelchair. Voiced by Angela Griffin. Becky Wright voiced her in Postman Pat: The Movie. 
 Alf Thompson (series 1–8): a farmer, working with his wife, Dorothy, on his farm to make sure his sheep doesn't get into trouble. Voiced by Ken Barrie from series 1 to 6 and Lewis MacLeod from series 7 to present. Darren Richardson voiced him in Postman Pat: The Movie.
Bill Thompson (series 1–8): black-haired ten-year-old schoolchild and the son of Alf and Dorothy. Voiced by Ken Barrie in series 1, Carole Boyd in series 2 and Kulvinder Ghir from series 3 to present. Steven Kynman voiced him in Postman Pat: The Movie.
Dorothy Thompson (series 1–8): a blonde farmer, Dorothy runs Thompson Ground with her husband Alf. Voiced by Ken Barrie in series 1 and Carole Boyd from series 2 onwards. Olivia Poulet voiced her in Postman Pat: The Movie.
Reverend Peter Timms (series 1-8): the white-haired local Church of England vicar. He was voiced by Ken Barrie from series 1-6 and Dan Milne from series 7-8.
Sam Waldron (series 1–2): the owner of a mobile shop. He is a good old friend of Pat; they once assisted each other by delivering together. Pat often picks up the odd pack of biscuits or cough medicine from the shop. He was voiced by Ken Barrie.
Amy Wrigglesworth (series 5–8): a Veterinary physician who has come to work from Skegness. Voiced by Angela Griffin. Aimee Osbourne voiced her in Postman Pat: The Movie.

References

Postman Pat